Medinilla sedifolia is a perennial plant of the family Melastomataceae that grows primarily in Madagascar, but is occasionally used as a terrarium plant, an epiphyte mounting, or in hanging pots. The waxy evergreen leaves grow on a trailing stem.

Etymology
Medinilla is named for José de Medinilla y Pineda, who was governor of Mauritius (then known as the Marianne Islands) in 1820.

References

sedifolia
Taxa named by Joseph Marie Henry Alfred Perrier de la Bâthie
Taxa named by Henri Lucien Jumelle